The Larson–Miller relation, also widely known as the Larson–Miller parameter and often abbreviated LMP, is a parametric relation used to extrapolate experimental data on creep and rupture life of engineering materials.

Background and usage

F.R. Larson and J. Miller proposed that creep rate could adequately be described by the Arrhenius type equation:

Taking the natural log of both sides:

With some rearrangement:

Using the fact that creep rate is inversely proportional to time, the equation can be written as:

Taking the natural log:

After some rearrangement the relation finally becomes:

,  where B =  

This equation is of the same form as the Larson–Miller relation.

where the quantity LMP is known as the Larson–Miller parameter.  Using the assumption that activation energy is independent of applied stress, the equation can be used to relate the difference in rupture life to differences in temperature for a given stress.  The material constant C is typically found to be in the range of 20 to 22 for metals when time is expressed in hours and temperature in degrees Rankine.

The Larson–Miller model is used for experimental tests so that results at certain temperatures and stresses can predict rupture lives of time spans that would  be impractical to reproduce in the laboratory.

Expanding the equation as a Taylor series makes the relationship easier to understand.  Only the first terms are kept.

Changing the time, by a factor of 10, changes the logarithm by 1 and the LMP changes by an amount equal to the temperature. 

To get an equal change in LMP by changing the temperature, the temperature needs to be raised or lowered by about 5% of its absolute value.

Typically a 5% increase in absolute temperature will increase the rate of creep by a factor of ten.

The equation was developed during the 1950s while Miller and Larson were employed by GE performing research on turbine blade life.

See also
 Creep (deformation)

References

Hertzberg, Richard W.  Deformation and Fracture Mechanics of Engineering Materials, Fourth Edition.  John Wiley and Sons, Inc., Hoboken, NJ: 1996.
Larson, Frank R. and Miller, James: A Time-Temperature Relationship for Rupture and Creep Stresses. Trans. ASME, vol. 74, pp. 765−775.
 Fuchs, G. E. High Temperature Alloys, Kirk–Othmer Encyclopedia of Chemical Technology
 Smith & Hashemi, Foundations of Material Science and Engineering
 Dieter, G.E.  Mechanical Metallurgy, Third Edition, McGraw-Hill Inc., 1986, p 461-465, .

Materials science